Hoya australis, commonly known as the waxvine or common waxflower, is one of the species in the genus Hoya. It is a vine found on rainforest margins and rocky areas, and occurs in eastern and northern Australia, from Western Australia, through the Northern Territory and coastal Queensland from Cape York to northern New South Wales. It is a popular garden plant, noted for its fragrant flowers.

Taxonomy
The common waxflower was originally described in 1828 by the botanist Robert Brown, its specific epithet australis is Latin for "southern".

Subspecies
Hoya australis australis 
Hoya australis oramicola — described by botanists Paul Forster and David Liddle in 1991, it is restricted to Bathurst Island off the Northern Territory coast. 
Hoya australis rupicola in the Kimberley (Western Australia) region and the Northern Territory
Hoya australis sana
Hoya australis sanae
Hoya australis tenuipes — features glossy round foliage that is thinner compared to other Hoya australis varieties. In the warmer season, it produces clusters of white flowers with red centers.

Description
Hoya australis is an evergreen climbing vine which may reach . It has simple opposite glabrous (shiny) leaves 3–6 cm long and 2–5 cm wide. They are succulent (thick and fleshy) and elliptical or ovate in shape; leaves growing in sunnier positions are a more yellowish green while those in shadier locales are dark green in colour. Flowering may occur at any time of year. The flowers appear in axillary umbellate clusters at the apex of 0.5–2.5 cm long peduncles. Each flower is 1.5–2.5 cm in diameter, with five thick, waxy, triangular petals, and white with each lobe marked red. They have a strong sweet scent and produce abundant nectar.

Ecology
It serves as a food plant for the caterpillars of the Queensland butterfly the no-brand crow (Euploea alcathoe), and the common Australian crow (E. core). Flowers are pollinated by the southern grass-dart (Ocybadistes walkeri).

Distribution and habitat
In Australia, it is found from Grafton in northern New South Wales northwards to Cape York in north Queensland. It grows on the edges of rainforest and in rocky exposed habitats.

Cultivation
It is a popular garden and houseplant in Australia, where it flowers best in a well-lit position. It is often grown in containers and trained to grow on trellises on verandahs, fences and in glasshouses. It is a butterfly-attracting plant in the garden. It can be grown indoors provided it receives direct sunlight.

References

External links

australis
Gentianales of Australia
Flora of Western Australia
Flora of Queensland
Flora of New South Wales
Garden plants of Australia
Vines